Throup is a surname of British origin, meaning "at the thorp".

People with the surname
 Aitor Throup (born 1980), Argentine-British fashion designer, artist, and creative director
 Maggie Throup (born 1957), British politician
 Matilde Throup (1876–1922), Chilean attorney

See also
 Thorpe (disambiguation)
 Throop (disambiguation)

References

Surnames of British Isles origin